Harry Ivarson (September 7, 1892 – 1967) was a Norwegian film director and screenwriter.

Ivarson was born in Chicago, the son of the actor William Ivarson and actress Anna Ivarson. In addition to Harry, the couple had a son Wictor (born in 1893) and a daughter Borghild (born in 1895). In 1910 the family lived in Årstad.

Ivarson studied film in the United States and Germany. He debuted as a director and screenwriter in Germany in 1923 with the film Wenn Männer richten under the pseudonym Harry Williams. He continued his career in Norway with the films Til sæters (1924), Fager er lien (1925), Simen Mustrøens besynderlige opplevelser (1926), Madame besøker Oslo (1927), and Den glade enke i Trangvik (1927), which was his last silent film. In the 1930s, Ivarson switched to sound films, and together with Per Aabel he directed Jeppe på bjerget in 1933. He directed his last film in 1943, the documentary Bergen. Ivarson was the head of the NRK office in Bergen during the Second World War.

Filmography

Director
 1923: Wenn Männer richten
 1924: Til sæters
 1925: Fager er lien
 1926: Simen Mustrøens besynderlige opplevelser
 1927: Madame besøker Oslo
 1927: Den glade enke i Trangvik
 1933: Jeppe på bjerget
 1943: Bergen

Screenwriter
 1923: Wenn Männer richten
 1924: Til sæters
 1925: Fager er lien
 1926: Simen Mustrøens besynderlige opplevelser
 1927: Madame besøker Oslo
 1927: Den glade enke i Trangvik
 1933: Jeppe på bjerget
 1943: Bergen

References

Norwegian film directors
Norwegian screenwriters
Film directors from Illinois
1892 births
1967 deaths
20th-century screenwriters